Frederic Mather Lord (November 12, 1912 – February 5, 2000) was a psychometrician for Educational Testing Service. The SAT, GRE, GMAT, LSAT and TOEFL are all based on Lord's research.

Early life
Lord was born on November 12, 1912, in Hanover, New Hampshire. His great-great-grandfather, Nathan Lord, served as the sixth president of Dartmouth College, from which Lord graduated with a bachelor's degree in Sociology in 1936. He later earned a master's degree in Educational Psychology from the University of Minnesota, followed by a PhD in Psychology from Princeton University in 1951.

Career
Lord first worked for the Carnegie Foundation in 1944. By 1950, he began working for the Educational Testing Service (ETS). He was the source of much of the seminal research on item response theory, including two important books: Statistical Theories of Mental Test Scores (1968, with Melvin R. Novick, and two chapters by Allan Birnbaum), and Applications of Item Response Theory to Practical Testing Problems (1980).

Lord's research shaped the SAT, GRE, GMAT, LSAT and the TOEFL. Lord was called the "Father of Modern Testing" by the National Council on Measurement in Education.

Personal life and death
Lord was married twice. He had three sons with his first wife. His second wife was Muriel Kendall.

Lord died on February 5, 2000, in Naples, Florida, at 87.

References

1912 births
2000 deaths
People from Hanover, New Hampshire
Dartmouth College alumni
University of Minnesota College of Education and Human Development alumni
Princeton University alumni
20th-century American mathematicians
Psychometricians
Fellows of the American Statistical Association